Voet is the surname of:

Alexander Voet the Elder (1608-1689), Flemish printmaker and publisher
Alexander Voet the Younger (1637–1693/1705), Flemish printmaker and publisher
Donald Voet, American biochemist and textbook author
Gijsbert Voet (1589–1676), Dutch theologian
Jacob Ferdinand Voet (c. 1639 – c. 1689/1700), a Flemish Baroque portrait painter
Johann Eusebius Voet (1706–1788), Dutch physician, poet, illustrator, and entomologist
Johannes Voet (1647–1713), Dutch jurist
Judith G. Voet, American biochemist and textbook author
Willy Voet (born 1945), Belgian sports physiotherapist

See also
Vogt (surname)